Air Chief Marshal Sir Henry Neil George Wheeler,  (8 July 1917 – 9 January 2009) was a senior Royal Air Force (RAF) officer.

Military career
Educated St Helen's College in Southsea and the Royal Air Force College Cranwell, Wheeler was commissioned into the RAF in 1935. He served with Bomber Command from 1937 and then spent part of the Second World War as Officer Commanding No. 236 Squadron in Fighter Command before going to the RAF Staff College and US Army Staff College in 1943.

After the war he joined the Directing Staff at the RAF Staff College and then transferred to the Far East Air Force in 1947. He was posted to the Directing Staff at the Joint Services Staff College in 1949 and to Bomber Command in 1951 before going to the Air Ministry in 1953. He was appointed Assistant Commandant at the RAF College in 1957 and Officer Commanding RAF Laarbruch in 1959. He attended the Imperial Defence College in 1961 and then served in the Ministry of Defence from 1961. He became Senior Air Staff Officer at Headquarters RAF Germany (2 Tactical Air Force) in 1963 and Assistant Chief of Defence Staff (Operational Requirements) in 1966. He was made Deputy Chief of the Defence Staff (Operational Requirements) in 1967 and Commander of the Far East Air Force in 1969. He was Air Member for Supply and Organisation at the Ministry of Defence from 1970 and then Controller of Aircraft at the Procurement Executive from 1973.

In retirement he became a Director of Rolls-Royce Limited.

Family
In 1942 he married Elizabeth Weightman and then went on to have two sons and a daughter. He was the younger brother of Major General Norman Wheeler, and uncle of General Sir Roger Wheeler.

References

External links
Obituary in The Daily Telegraph
The Battle of Britain Historical Society Discussion Forum: Obituary

|-

|-

|-

1917 births
2009 deaths
People from Pretoria
Non-U.S. alumni of the Command and General Staff College
Graduates of the Royal College of Defence Studies
Knights Grand Cross of the Order of the Bath
Commanders of the Order of the British Empire
Companions of the Distinguished Service Order
Recipients of the Air Force Cross (United Kingdom)
Royal Air Force air marshals
Graduates of the Royal Air Force College Cranwell
British World War II pilots
Recipients of the Distinguished Flying Cross (United Kingdom)